Camila Silva may refer to:

 Camila Silva (singer) (born 1994), Chilean singer-songwriter
 Camila Silva (tennis) (born 1992), Chilean tennis player